Leones de Ponce refers to several related club sports teams in Ponce, Puerto Rico, including:

Leones de Ponce (baseball), a baseball team in the LBPRC
Leones de Ponce (basketball), a basketball team in the BSN
Leones de Ponce (volleyball), a volleyball team in the LVSM
Leonas de Ponce, a female volleyball team in the LVSF